Petrohué River is a Chilean river located in the Los Lagos Region of Chile. It originates from Todos los Santos Lake in the Vicente Pérez Rosales National Park. At its origin are the Petrohué Waterfalls.

Sport fishing 
The Petrohue River is well known for its recreational fishing; the fishing season begins on November and ends in May.

Species found in the river include:
 Chinook salmon
 Brown trout
 Rainbow trout
 Atlantic salmon
 Coho salmon
 Perca trout

References

Rivers of Los Lagos Region
Rivers of Chile